KJLV may refer to:

 KJLV (FM), a radio station (97.7 FM) licensed to Los Altos, California, United States
 KLFJ (FM), a radio station (105.3 FM) licensed to Hoxie, Arkansas, which held the call sign KJLV from 2001 to 2019
 KMKL (FM), a radio station (90.3 FM) licensed to North Branch, Minnesota, United States, which held the call sign KJLV in 2001